China Construction America Founded in 1985, China Construction America (CCA) is a subsidiary of China State Construction Engineering Corporation Ltd. (CSCEC) — the world's largest construction and real estate conglomerate and the biggest global contractor — that operates on the East Coast of the U.S and the Gulf of Mexico, the Caribbean, and Latin America, having many finished and ongoing projects worldwide. CSCEC was ranked the 18th on Fortune Global 500 list.

Headquartered in Jersey City, NJ, CCA operates mainly in New York, New Jersey, Washington, DC, South Carolina, North Carolina, Louisiana, Florida, California, the Caribbean, and Panama. CCA provides a range of construction services, such as program management, construction management, general contracting, design-build and public-private partnership assistance for public and private clients.

CCA was ranked the 57th biggest contractors in the 2020 Engineering News-Record Top 400 Contractors list, the 35th biggest construction management-at-risk firms by ENR in 2020, the 35th on 2020 ENR Southeast Top Contractors, and the tenth on the Top Contractors in Bridges.



History
Founded in 1985, China Construction America (CCA) is a subsidiary of China State Construction Engineering Corp. Ltd. (CSCEC). In 2001, the CCA office in the World Trade Center was destroyed in the September 11 terrorist attacks, the company had to move its headquarters from the World Trade Center to Jersey City. On April 4, 2014, CCA acquired Plaza Construction, one of the nation's leading construction management and general contracting companies. The sale is prompted by the dynamic growth of Plaza and Fisher Brothers' desire to focus on the development side of their business. According to Richard Wood, the CEO of Plaza Construction, the acquisition is more about creating strategic relationships and sharing resources.

Project highlights
Rehabilitation of the Alexander Hamilton Bridge, New York and Bronx, NY:
No. 3 of Top 10 Bridges Award by Roads & Bridges Magazine, 2013
Excellence in Partnering Award for Formal Partnering by the AGC of New York State, 2013
Award of Merit Highways/Bridges by Engineering News-Record, 2014
Construction Achievement Project of the Year Award by the ASCE Metropolitan Section, 2014
Tien Yow Jeme Civil Engineering Prize by the China Civil Engineering Society (CCES), 2015

Ventilation Shafts for the 7 Subway Extension, New York, NY:
Construction Achievement Project of the Year Award from the American Society of Civil Engineers, 2016
ENR Best of the Best Award, 2016

Fulton Center, New York, NY:
Project of the Year by New York State Society of Professional Engineers, 2014
Diamond Award by American Council of Engineering Companies of New York, 2014
Excellence Honorable Mention Award by Center for Active Design, 2015
Best of Design Awards by The Architect's Newspaper, 2015
MASterworks Best New Building Award by the Municipal Art Society of New York, 2015
Construction Achievement Project of the Year Award by the ASCE Metropolitan Section, 2015

River Bluff High School, Lexington, SC:
Excellence in Construction Awards, 2013

West Eighth Street–New York Aquarium station, Brooklyn, NY:
Best of 2004 Award by New York Construction, 2004
Design Award by AIA New York State, 2006

Power Plant, Astoria, NY:
New York Tri-State's Top 40 Projects by New York Construction, 2005
Best of 2006 by ENR New York, 2006
New Project Award by General Building Contractors, 2007
Building of America Award by Real Estate & Construction Review, 2009

Brookfield Place Glass Pavilion, New York, NY:
Award of Merit: Office/Retail/Mixed-Use by ENR, 2014
Innovative Design in Engineering and Architecture with Structural Steel (IDEAS2) and Merit Award for Excellence by the American Institute of Steel Construction (AISC), 2014
Outstanding Public Space for 2014 by the Greater New York Construction User Council, 2014

One Thousand Museum, Miami, FL

Baha Mar Mega Resort, Nassau, The Bahamas

Other projects

Infrastructure 
Pulaski Skyway, South Kearny, NJ
Wittpenn Bridge, Kearny, NJ
Replacement of Shore (Belt) Parkway Bridge over Gerritsen Inlet Bridge, New York, NY
Staten Island Expressway, New York, NY
Nassau Airport Gateway, Nassau, The Bahamas
San Isidro Bus Station, San Miguelito, Panama

Real estate 
 Park and Shore Luxury Condominiums, Jersey City, NJ
 445 South Street, Morristown, NJ
 Broadstone Post Oak, Houston, TX
 The Pointe, Nassau, The Bahamas
 British Colonial Nassau Hilton Hotel, Nassau, The Bahamas

Hospitality and residential 
 Baha Mar Mega Resort, Nassau, The Bahamas
 150 Charles Street, New York, NY
AC Hotel by Marriottsm, Miami, FL
Marquis Residences, Miami, FL
Marea Condominiums, Miami, FL
One Ocean South Beach, Miami, FL
W South Beach, Miami, FL
City of Hope, Panama City, Panama
Beach House 8, Miami, FL
Paraiso Bayviews, Miami, FL
Gran Paraiso, Miami, FL

Education
Clinton High School (South Carolina), Laurens County, SC
River Bluff High School, Lexington, SC
Nation Ford High School, Fort Mill, SC
Dreher High School, Columbia, SC
Chapman High School (Inman, South Carolina), Spartanburg County School District, SC
Blue Ridge High School (South Carolina), Greenville, SC
Santee High School and Technology Center, Los Angeles, CA

Business divisions
Plaza Construction
CCA Civil
CCA South America
Strategic Capital

References

External links
 China Construction America Official Site

Government-owned companies of China
Construction and civil engineering companies of China
Chinese companies established in 1985
Construction and civil engineering companies established in 1985